Galleria at Tyler, formerly known as Tyler Mall, is a shopping mall located in Riverside, California, anchored by Forever 21, JCPenney, and Macy's, and Furniture City.

Anchor stores

Current

J. C. Penney (1970–present)
Macy's (north building: 1996–2006, south building: 2006-present)
Forever 21 (2011–present, replaced north building Macy's)
Furniture City (2022–present)

Former
May Company California (1973-1993, replaced with Robinsons-May)
Robinsons-May (1993-2006, replaced with south building Macy's)
Nordstrom (1991-2020, replaced with Furniture City)

History
Tyler Mall opened on October 12, 1970, as a one-story, two-anchor (J. C. Penney and The Broadway) retail destination for the steadily-growing Inland Empire.

In 1973, May Company California opened as an anchor store.

Tyler Mall underwent its first renovation in 1991 with a second story, Nordstrom as its third anchor tenant and reopening as the Galleria at Tyler.

2006 and 2007 saw the mall's second expansion with an increased focus on restaurant out-parcels. The Cheesecake Factory and P. F. Chang's China Bistro opened in 2006 with Yard House following in 2007. AMC Theatres and Robbins Brothers opened that year as well.

On December 6, 2015, three men with sledgehammers and axes entered Ben Bridge Jeweler near J. C. Penney. They smashed glass display cases and stole thousands of dollars worth of jewelry. This happened just four days after the 2015 San Bernardino attack. Distant shoppers mistook the sound of smashing glass for gunshots. The first 9-1-1 calls came in at around 6:30 p.m; over 100 police officers and SWAT team members arrived due to initial belief it was an active shooting. Shoppers were allowed to exit an hour later after officers searched the mall. All suspects have been caught. 

In 2020, Nordstrom announced it would close its store at Tyler by August 2020.

In August 2022, Furniture City opened in the former Nordstrom location.

References

External links

Brookfield Properties
Shopping malls in Riverside County, California
Shopping malls established in 1970
1970 establishments in California